Francis Leslie Parker (19 March 1927 – 15 January 2014) was an Australian rules footballer who played with Footscray in the Victorian Football League (VFL). 

Parker had two games (both as 19th/20th man) for Footscray in early 1948 before moving to Port Melbourne in the middle of the year.

Les Parker died in January 2014.

Notes

External links 

Les Parker's playing statistics from The VFA Project

1927 births
Australian rules footballers from Victoria (Australia)
Western Bulldogs players
2014 deaths